Bruce Brubaker is a musician, artist, concert pianist, and writer from the United States.

Concepts
Brubaker's work uses and combines Western classical music with postmodern artistic, literary, theatrical, and philosophical ideas. He is associated with the twenty-first century revitalization of classical music (sometimes termed "alternative classical"). With over 150 million plays on Spotify, Brubaker reaches a large music audience online. Brubaker's recordings have been remixed by prominent electronic musicians, including Plaid, Max Cooper, Akufen, Francesco Tristano, Arandel, and others. The New York Times wrote: "Few pianists approach Philip Glass's music with the level of devotion and insight that Bruce Brubaker brings to it, precisely the reason he gets so much expressivity out of it." He has performed at London’s Barbican Hall, the Philharmonie de Paris, New York’s David Geffen Hall, and at BOZAR in Brussels. He has created and performed multidisciplinary artworks at the Festival de La Roque-d'Anthéron, the Institute of Contemporary Art, Boston, Princeton's Institute for Advanced Study, the Irving S. Gilmore International Keyboard Festival, Columbia University, and at the Juilliard School. 

Brubaker has published articles about music and semiotics, and performance as research. He advocates the treatment of written music as "text". He has sometimes performed and recorded new music without the direct input of the composer. Brubaker has said: "The piano is a tool that can be used in different ways. Classical music can be taken as material for new art." Brubaker has argued that technology is returning music to a pre-composer condition, and equalizing or blurring the roles of listener, performer, and composer. In a conversation with Philip Glass in Princeton, Brubaker referred to "the demise of the composer". Brubaker said: "Now, it's becoming a little less clear who creates a work, who plays the work, and who listens to the work. Those roles used to seem to be so clear – you know, Beethoven wrote it, Brendel played it, and the audience at Carnegie heard it. But I don't think that quite works anymore."

Background
Brubaker was born in Des Moines, Iowa, in the United States and educated at the Juilliard School where his primary teacher was pianist Jacob Lateiner. At Juilliard, he also studied with Milton Babbitt and Felix Galimir, and with Louis Krasner at Tanglewood. As a concert pianist, he has appeared performing Mozart with the Los Angeles Philharmonic at the Hollywood Bowl, Haydn's music at the Wigmore Hall, Alvin Curran's music at Kings Place in London, Messiaen's music and Philip Glass's music at New York City's (Le) Poisson Rouge nightclub, Brahms's music at Leipzig's Gewandhaus, and extemporizing simultaneous performances with his former student Francesco Tristano and jazz legend Ran Blake.

He received a fellowship grant from the National Endowment from the Arts, and was named Young Musician of the Year by Musical America. Brubaker was a National Merit Scholar. He has performed at New York's Zankel Hall, Antwerp's Queen Elizabeth Hall, the Tanglewood Festival, and the Sónar festival in Barcelona. Brubaker's blog PianoMorphosis appears at ArtsJournal.com.

Recording
Brubaker's solo piano recordings survey a range of American music by Philip Glass, John Adams, Alvin Curran, William Duckworth, Meredith Monk, Nico Muhly, and John Cage. Brubaker has premiered piano music by Cage, Mark-Anthony Turnage, Nico Muhly, and Daron Hagen. He has collaborated with Meredith Monk. In 2012, Brubaker, together with Ursula Oppens, recorded Monk's piano music. His album Codex includes multiple readings of Terry Riley's Keyboard Study No. 2 and Renaissance keyboard pieces from the Codex Faenza.

Curator and teacher
For nine years, Brubaker was a faculty member at the Juilliard School where he originated an interdisciplinary performance program in 2001, producing new work with dancers, actors, and musicians. Students from Brubaker's piano repertory class at Juilliard include many distinguished pianists: Francesco Tristano, Simone Dinnerstein, Shai Wosner, Helen Huang, Vicky Chow, David Greilsammer, Elizabeth Joy Roe, Greg Anderson, Vikingur Olafsson, Stewart Goodyear, Adam Nieman, Soyeon Lee, Terrence Wilson, Christopher Guzman, Eric Huebner. At Juilliard, he gave public presentations with Philip Glass, Meredith Monk, and Milton Babbitt. In 2000, he produced "Piano Century", an eleven-concert retrospective of 20th-century piano music. Since 2004, Brubaker is a faculty member at Boston's New England Conservatory where he has curated several projects in collaboration with the Boston Symphony and Harvard University. At New England Conservatory, Brubaker has appeared in public conversations with Alvin Curran, Meredith Monk, Tim Page, Salvatore Sciarrino and Russell Sherman. He serves as Curator of Piano Programming at New England Conservatory.

In 1994, Brubaker founded SummerMusic now held at Drake University in his hometown of Des Moines; he returns annually to lead it.

Discography
Brubaker records for ECM, InFiné, Arabesque, and Bedroom Community.
 Brahms, Wagner, Steuermann, music for piano by Brahms, Wagner, and Eduard Steuermann, Vital Music, 1994
 glass cage, music for piano by Philip Glass and John Cage, Arabesque, 2000
 Inner Cities, music for piano by John Adams and Alvin Curran, Arabesque, 2004
 Hope Street Tunnel Blues, music for piano by Philip Glass and Alvin Curran, Arabesque, 2007
 Time Curve, music for piano by Glass and William Duckworth, Arabesque, 2009
 Drones & Piano EP, music for piano and electronics by Nico Muhly, Bedroom Community, 2012
 Drones & Viola EP, with Nadia Sirota, viola, music for viola and piano by Nico Muhly, Bedroom Community, 2012
 Drones, with Nadia Sirota, viola, Pekka Kuusisto, violin, Nico Muhly, piano, Bedroom Community, 2012
 Piano Songs, music for solo piano and 2 pianos by Meredith Monk, including arrangements by Brubaker, ECM, 2014
 Glass Piano, music for piano by Philip Glass, including arrangements by Brubaker, InFiné (Warp Records), 2015
 Glass Piano: Versions, remixes by Plaid, Francesco Tristano, Akufen, John Beltran, Biblo, and Julian Earle, InFiné (Warp Records), 2015
 Revelations, music for solo piano and chamber music by Su Lian Tan, Arsis, 2017
 Codex, music from Codex Faenza and six versions of Terry Riley's Keyboard Study No. 2, InFiné (Warp Records), 2018
 Codex Versions, remixes by Max Cooper, Olga Bell, and Arandel, InFiné (Warp Records), 2018
 Glassforms, music by Philip Glass, Bruce Brubaker, and Max Cooper, InFiné, 2020
 Glassforms Versions, music by Philip Glass, Bruce Brubaker, Max Cooper, Donato Dozzy, Laurel Halo, Tegh, and Daniele Di Gregorio, InFiné, 2021

Arrangements and transcriptions
John Adams: “Pat’s Aria” (from Nixon in China) (transcribed for solo piano by Bruce Brubaker)
Gustav Mahler: “Bruce Brubaker’s Mahler’s Ninth Symphony” (piano, violin, viola, cello)
Philip Glass: “Knee Play 4” (from Einstein on the Beach) (transcribed for solo piano by Bruce Brubaker)
Olivier Messiaen: Prelude No. 1, “La colombe” (transcribed for flute and piano by Bruce Brubaker, for Paula Robison)
Meredith Monk: Totentanz (transcribed for 2 pianos by Bruce Brubaker)
Meredith Monk: Parlour Games (transcribed for 2 pianos by Bruce Brubaker)
Meredith Monk: Urban March (Shadow) (transcribed for 2 pianos by Bruce Brubaker)
Meredith Monk: Tower (transcribed for 2 pianos by Bruce Brubaker)

References

Year of birth missing (living people)
Living people
People from Des Moines, Iowa
American classical pianists
American male classical pianists
Record producers from Iowa
Juilliard School alumni
Juilliard School faculty
New England Conservatory faculty
Musicians from Iowa
21st-century classical pianists
21st-century American male musicians
21st-century American pianists